Sir Thomas Bland Royden, 1st Baronet (20 February 1831 – 29 August 1917) was an English ship-owner and Conservative Party politician.

Royden was the son of Thomas Royden of Liverpool. He was educated at Liverpool College and became head of Thomas Royden & Sons, shipowners. He became a member of Liverpool City Council in 1873, and was Mayor of Liverpool in 1878–1879. He was also a J.P. for Liverpool. At the 1885 general election Royden was elected Member of Parliament for Liverpool West Toxteth and held the seat until he stood down at the 1892 general election. He was High Sheriff of Cheshire in 1903, was appointed a deputy lieutenant of Cheshire at the end of the year, and was created a Baronet on 29 July 1905. Royden lived at Frankby Hall. He died at the age of 86.

Royden married Alice Elizabeth Dowdall. Their son Thomas Royden was later MP for Bootle and became Lord Royden. Their daughter Maude Royden became a preacher and suffragist.

References

External links 
 

1831 births
1917 deaths
Conservative Party (UK) MPs for English constituencies
UK MPs 1885–1886
UK MPs 1886–1892
British businesspeople in shipping
Baronets in the Baronetage of the United Kingdom
Deputy Lieutenants of Cheshire
High Sheriffs of Cheshire
Mayors of Liverpool
People educated at Liverpool College
19th-century British businesspeople